The Whitstable School is a coeducational secondary school and sixth form located in Whitstable, Kent, England.

It was established in 1952 as the Sir William Nottidge School and was known by this name until 1998 when it was changed to The Community College Whitstable. In 2018 it was renamed as The Whitstable School (to hide the stigma associated with the previous name) after converting to academy status. The school is administered by The Swale Academies Trust.

History
In 1998, the name Sir William Nottidge was dropped and the school was relaunched as the Community College Whitstable along with the introduction of a new badge and re-introduction of the house system. The school joined Swale Academies Trust in 2018 which also includes Westlands School, Westlands Primary School, Regis Manor Primary School, Meopham School and The Sittingbourne School.

School structure
The house system was established in 1952, when there were four houses: Coppens, Minters, Torrith and Sedberry, each of which had selected house prefects. The house colours were: red for Coppens, yellow for Minters, blue for Torrith and green for Sedberry.

The school is now divided into two houses and is based around two famous ships, Victory and Endeavour. The famous warship HMS Victory is best known as Lord Nelson’s flagship at the Battle of Trafalgar in 1805. HMS Endeavour was the British Royal Navy research vessel that Lieutenant James Cook commanded on his first voyage of discovery, to Australia and New Zealand, from 1769 to 1771.

Curriculum
The school year runs from September to July, split across three terms: the autumn term (September to December), spring term (January to April) and the summer term (April to July). Students receive two weeks off for Christmas and Easter, a six-week summer break, and three "half term"

The essential core skills of literacy and numeracy are developed daily through English and maths lessons. In addition, cross-curricular standards ensure these important elements are delivered in all subjects.

In Years 7 and 8 they offer a wide curriculum, yet focus more time on the core subjects. In Year 9 a further emphasis is placed upon the core subjects, complemented with Ebacc subject opportunities (languages, history, geography and/ or computer science). Year 9 also introduces an element of curriculum choice for pupils who can choose foundation subjects to provide engagement and broaden their horizons. These choices can be taken forward to Key Stage 4 giving pupils a head start on their examination subjects. At Key Stage 4 they offer the core subjects supported by the early work completed in Year 9 on the Ebacc subjects. Pupils complete their examination offer with foundation subjects. All courses are fully accredited and recognised for further study at Key Stage 5 and beyond.

References

Secondary schools in Kent
Educational institutions established in 1952
1952 establishments in England
Academies in Kent